Barber County (county code BA) is a county located in the south-central portion of the U.S. state of Kansas. As of the 2020 census, the county population was 4,228. Its county seat and most populous city is Medicine Lodge. It was named for Thomas Barber, an abolitionist who was killed in Douglas County in 1855 during the Wakarusa War.

Geography

Adjacent counties
 Pratt County (north)
 Kingman County (northeast)
 Harper County (east)
 Alfalfa County, Oklahoma (southeast)
 Woods County, Oklahoma (southwest)
 Comanche County (west)
 Kiowa County (northwest)

Major highways
Sources:  National Atlas, U.S. Census Bureau
 U.S. Route 160
 U.S. Route 281
 Kansas Highway 2

Demographics

As of the 2000 census, there were 5,307 people, 2,235 households, and 1,510 families residing in the county.  The population density was 5 people per square mile (2/km2).  There were 2,740 housing units at an average density of 2 per square mile (1/km2).  The racial makeup of the county was 97.06% White, 0.38% Black or African American, 0.58% Native American, 0.09% Asian, 0.89% from other races, and 1.00% from two or more races. Hispanic or Latino of any race were 2.02% of the population.

There were 2,235 households, out of which 28.70% had children under the age of 18 living with them, 58.70% were married couples living together, 6.50% had a female householder with no husband present, and 32.40% were non-families. 29.90% of all households were made up of individuals, and 17.00% had someone living alone who was 65 years of age or older.  The average household size was 2.35 and the average family size was 2.91.

In the county, the population was spread out, with 25.00% under the age of 18, 5.80% from 18 to 24, 23.20% from 25 to 44, 24.50% from 45 to 64, and 21.50% who were 65 years of age or older.  The median age was 43 years. For every 100 females there were 92.40 males.  For every 100 females age 18 and over, there were 89.40 males.

The median income for a household in the county was $33,407, and the median income for a family was $40,234. Males had a median income of $29,806 versus $20,046 for females. The per capita income for the county was $16,627.  About 7.50% of families and 10.10% of the population were below the poverty line, including 12.60% of those under age 18 and 4.90% of those age 65 or over.

Government
Barber County Is a Republican stronghold. The last Democrat to carry this county was Lyndon B. Johnson in 1964.

Presidential elections

Laws
Barber County allows the sale of liquor at not only liquor stores but also in restaurants.

Economy
RSI Corporation

Education

Unified school districts
 Barber County North USD 254
 South Barber USD 255

Communities

Cities
 Hardtner
 Hazelton
 Isabel
 Kiowa
 Medicine Lodge
 Sharon
 Sun City

Unincorporated communities

 Aetna
 Deerhead
 Eldred
 Elm Mills
 Forest City
 Gerlane
 Lake City
 Mingona
 Pixley
 Stubbs

Ghost towns
 Forest City
 Lasswell
 Mingona
 Pixley

Townships
Barber County is divided into eighteen townships.  None of the cities within the county are considered governmentally independent, and all figures for the townships include those of the cities.  In the following table, the population center is the largest city (or cities) included in that township's population total, if it is of a significant size.

See also
 National Register of Historic Places listings in Barber County, Kansas

References

Further reading

 Chosen Land: A History of Barber County, Kansas; The Barber County History Committee; Taylor Printing; 1980.
 Standard Atlas of Barber County, Kansas; Geo. A. Ogle & Co; 76 pages; 1923.
 Standard Atlas of Barber County, Kansas; Geo. A. Ogle & Co; 64 pages; 1905.

External links

County
 
 Barber County - Directory of Public Officials
 Barber County - Development 
Maps
 Barber County Maps: Current, Historic, KDOT
 Kansas Highway Maps: Current, Historic, KDOT
 Kansas Railroad Maps: Current, 1996, 1915, KDOT and Kansas Historical Society

 
Kansas counties
1867 establishments in Kansas
Populated places established in 1867